

The 1st World Highwire Championships

Held May 3–5, 2007 in Seoul, Korea during the city's annual Hi Seoul Festival, the competition is a test of balance, agility, concentration and, more specifically, speed.  Competitors race individually across a thin cable, 30-mm thick, which is stretched one-km long over the Han River. The Cable was designed by the UK engineers Tony Gee & Partners.

Of the 18 highwire walkers competing, 16 successfully completed the walk, earning the distinction of co-owning the Guinness World Record for longest skywalk.

Two competitors were disqualified for non-completion of the walk.  One, Wang Hui of China, tired halfway through and jumped into the water a few metres below him where a rescue boat was waiting while another, Alexey Marchenko of Russia, made a misstep just 100 metres from the end and fell about 10 metres.  Both were wet but uninjured and jovial.

One competitor, Jorge Arturo Ojeda, fell halfway through the walk dropping his balance pole. He was able to regain his footing after being brought a new pole and still completed the walk finishing with the 7th best time.

Final Results 

Tightrope walking